The 2005–06 USHL season was the 27th season of the United States Hockey League as an all-junior league. The regular season began on September 23, 2005, and concluded on March 1, 2006, with the regular season champion winning the Anderson Cup.

The Clark Cup playoffs featured the top four teams from each division competing for the league title.

Regular season
Final standings
Note: GP = Games played; W = Wins; L = Losses; OTL = Overtime losses; SL = Shootout losses; GF = Goals for; GA = Goals against; PTS = Points; x = clinched playoff berth; y = clinched division title; z = clinched league title

East Division

West Division

Clark Cup playoffs

Players

Scoring leaders

Leading goaltenders

Awards
Coach of the Year: Kevin Hartzell Sioux Falls Stampede
Curt Hammer Award: Trevor Lewis Des Moines Buccaneers
Defenseman of the Year: Nick Schaus Omaha Lancers
Forward of the Year: Trevor Lewis Des Moines Buccaneers
General Manager of the Year: Regg Simon Des Moines Buccaneers
Goaltender of the Year: Alex Stalock Cedar Rapids RoughRiders
Organization of the Year: Sioux Falls Stampede
Player of the Year: Trevor Lewis Des Moines Buccaneers
Rookie of the Year: Kyle Okposo Des Moines Buccaneers

References

External links
Official website of the United States Hockey League
2005-06 USHL Season (Hockey DB)
2005-06 USHL Season (Elite Prospects)

USHL
United States Hockey League seasons